Schur is a German or Jewish surname. Notable people with the surname include:

 Alexander Schur (born 1971), German footballer
 Dina Feitelson-Schur (1926–1992), Israeli educator
 Friedrich Schur (1856-1932), German mathematician
 Fritz Schur (born 1951), Danish businessman
 Issai Schur (1875–1941), Lithuanian-German-Israeli mathematician
 Max Schur (1897–1969), Austrian physician
 Michael Schur (born 1975), American television producer and writer
 Philipp Johann Ferdinand Schur, German-Austrian botanist, 1799-1878
 Täve Schur (born 1939), German cyclist

See also
 Schor (disambiguation)

Surnames from nicknames
German-language surnames
Jewish surnames